United Nations Security Council Resolution 317, adopted on July 21, 1972, following up on Resolution 316 the Council deplored the fact that despite its efforts Syrian and Lebanese military personnel abducted by Israeli armed forces from Lebanese territory on June 21 had not been released.  The Council requested the President of the Security Council and the Secretary-General make renewed efforts to implement the resolution and called upon Israel to return the Syrian and Lebanese personnel without delay.

The resolution was passed with 14 votes; the United States abstained from voting.

See also 
 Israeli–Lebanese conflict
 List of United Nations Security Council Resolutions 301 to 400 (1971–1976)

References 
Text of the Resolution at undocs.org

External links
 

 0317
 0317
Arab–Israeli peace process
1972 in Israel
1972 in Lebanon
 0317
July 1972 events